The 1961 Duke Blue Devils football team represented Duke University as a member of the Atlantic Coast Conference (ACC) during the 1961 NCAA University Division football season. Duke won the ACC championship with a record of 5–1 in conference play.

Schedule

References

Duke
Duke Blue Devils football seasons
Atlantic Coast Conference football champion seasons
Duke Blue Devils football